Bardhyl Demiraj (born 29 March 1958) is an Albanian linguist and Albanologist. He is considered one of the leading experts in the study of Albanian etymology.

Biography 
Bardhyl Demiraj was born on 29 March 1958 in Tirana, the son of linguist Shaban Demiraj. He studied Albanian language and literature at the University of Tirana from 1977 to 1981, earning a master's degree in 1982. From 1984 to 1986, he specialized in Indo-European, Romanian and Balkan linguistics at the University of Vienna. From 1991 to 1993, he did postgraduate research at the University of Bonn, earning a doctorate in Tirana in 1994 after a dissertation on the historical development of the Albanian number system.

From 1994, he collaborated on the Indo-European Etymological Dictionary at the University of Leiden, while continuing his etymological research in Bonn. In 2001, he was appointed Professor of Albanian at the Institute for Comparative and Indo-European Linguistics of the Ludwig Maximilian University of Munich.

Further reading 

 Interview with Panorama.al (in Albanian)

References 

1958 births
Albanologists
Linguists from Albania
Living people
Linguists of Indo-European languages